Parcel Direct Ireland is a courier service provider used by the general public in small and medium businesses within Ireland. Parcel Direct Ireland has formed shipping partnerships with logistics providers including FedEx, UPS, TNT, DHL, DPD, and GLS. Parcel Direct Ireland purchases services at wholesale rates and re-sells the services to their consumer and business customers.

The company was founded by Stephen O’ Sullivan in 2014. Based in a head office in Cork City, Parcel Direct Ireland offers courier services to consumers and small businesses throughout Ireland. They have also focused on the large number of Irish citizens living and relocating abroad.

In 2015 the company launched its eCommerce solutions in line with the Government National Digital Strategy to get more businesses throughout Ireland selling online. This includes working with the Local Enterprise Boards.

In 2016, Parcel Direct Ireland was nominated for the Blacknight SME Awards  for its developments.

Parcel Direct has a network of over 200 local drop off and collection points nationwide. These are based in local shops throughout Ireland.

References 

Irish companies established in 2014
Transport companies established in 2014